Tamila Ravilivna Tasheva is a Ukrainian activist and politician serving as the Permanent Representative of the President of Ukraine in the Autonomous Republic of Crimea since 25 April 2022.

Biography 
She was born on 1 August 1985, in Samarkand, Uzbek SSR, USSR, to a deported Crimean Tatar family. In 1991, she returned to Crimea with her family, like most of the other Crimean Tatars, and settled in Simferopol. She graduated at the Faculty of Oriental Languages at the Tavrida National V.I. Vernadsky University.

She participated in the Orange Revolution and organized rallies in Crimea. She later headed the Foundation for Regional Initiatives NGO branch in Crimea.

In 2006, she became an assistant to the people's deputy Lesya Orobets. She worked as an analyst for Viktor Yuschenko's Our Ukraine party. In 2010, she received a management position at the Nash Format publishing house. She later became a PR manager of the TIK band.

In December 2013, Tasheva took part in the Revolution of Dignity and demonstrations against Viktor Yanukovych's regime. In the winter of 2014, Tasheva, along with several other activists, created a Facebook page CrimeaSOS, which covered events leading up to the Russian annexation of Crimea. In early March, activists opened a hotline for asylum seekers in peaceful areas of the country. Soon CrimeaSOS grew into a wide volunteer network, which began to provide assistance to residents of the ATO Zone. Eventually, CrimeaSOS became a full-fledged public organization.

Following the Russian annexation of Crimea, Tasheva gathered facts about the disappearance, abuse and violation of Crimean Tatars.

On 20 February 2019, she was awarded the Order of Princess Olga.

On October 25, 2019, Tamila Tasheva became the winner of the Polish Sergio Vieira di Mello Award in the "Personality" category. The award is determined annually in two equivalent categories: the individual and the non-governmental organization, whose activities are aimed at the peaceful coexistence and cooperation between societies, religions and cultures.

In the 2019 parliamentary election, Tasheva ran for People's Deputy of Ukraine, as a candidate of Holos.

On 25 April 2022, President Volodymyr Zelenskyy appointed Tasheva as the new Permanent Representative of the President of Ukraine in the Autonomous Republic of Crimea, replacing Anton Korynevych.

References

External links

1985 births
Living people
Crimean Tatar politicians
Ukrainian human rights activists
Women human rights activists
Ukrainian politicians
People from Samarkand
Tavrida National V.I. Vernadsky University alumni
Presidential representatives of Ukraine in Crimea
Voice (Ukrainian political party) politicians
Recipients of the Order of Princess Olga, 3rd class